Véronique Besse (born 11 August 1963 in La Roche-sur-Yon, Vendée) is a member of the National Assembly of France and represents Vendée's 4th constituency. She is the current mayor of Les Herbiers, after being elected for the first time in 2014 with 57,76% of votes. She has been reelected at her position for a second time in 2020 with 67,18% of votes. Besse is a member of the Movement for France and does not align herself with any parliamentary group.

References

1963 births
Living people
People from La Roche-sur-Yon
Movement for France politicians
Women members of the National Assembly (France)
Deputies of the 13th National Assembly of the French Fifth Republic
Deputies of the 14th National Assembly of the French Fifth Republic
21st-century French women politicians
Deputies of the 16th National Assembly of the French Fifth Republic